Charles Robert Spencer, 6th Earl Spencer,  (30 October 1857 – 26 September 1922), styled The Honourable Charles Spencer until 1905 and known as Viscount Althorp between 1905 and 1910, was a British courtier and Liberal politician from the Spencer family. An MP from 1880 to 1895 and again from 1900 to 1905, he served as Vice-Chamberlain of the Household from 1892 to 1895. Raised to peerage as Viscount Althorp in 1905, he was Lord Chamberlain from 1905 to 1912 in the Liberal administrations headed by Sir Henry Campbell-Bannerman and H. H. Asquith. In 1910, he succeeded his half-brother as Earl Spencer. He was married to Margaret Baring, a member of the Baring family.

Background and education
Known as "Bobby", Spencer was born in St. James's, Westminster, the son of Frederick Spencer, 4th Earl Spencer, by his second wife Adelaide Seymour, daughter of Horace Beauchamp Seymour and granddaughter of Lord Hugh Seymour. John Spencer, 5th Earl Spencer, was his elder half-brother. He was educated at Harrow and Trinity College, Cambridge.

Political career
Spencer represented Northamptonshire North in parliament from 1880 to 1885 and Northamptonshire Mid from 1885 to 1895 and again from 1900 to 1905, from his home at Dallington Hall. In 1898, he contested Hertford. He was a Groom in Waiting to Queen Victoria between February and June 1886. In 1892, he was sworn of the Privy Council and appointed Vice-Chamberlain of the Household under William Ewart Gladstone, a post he held until 1895, the last year under the premiership of Lord Rosebery. Between 1900 and 1905, he was a Liberal whip.

On 19 December 1905, he was created Viscount Althorp, of Great Brington in the County of Northampton, to allow him to become Lord Chamberlain in Sir Henry Campbell-Bannerman's new Liberal administration. (His older brother was still Earl Spencer at that time, but was 70 years old and childless, and so it was clear that his younger brother would inherit.) On 13 August 1910, he inherited the earldom on the death of his childless elder brother, John Spencer, 5th Earl Spencer. He remained Lord Chamberlain until 1912. From 1908 to 1922, he was Lord Lieutenant of Northamptonshire. He was made a Knight Grand Cross of the Royal Victorian Order in 1911 and a Knight of the Garter in 1913. He was also awarded the Volunteer Reserve Decoration.

Lord Spencer held a large number of foreign decorations: the Grand Crosses of Order of the Dannebrog of Denmark, Royal Norwegian Order of St Olav, Order of the Polar Star of Sweden, Order of the Rising Sun of Japan, the White Eagle of Serbia, Order of the Red Eagle of Prussia and Royal and Distinguished Spanish Order of Carlos III. He was also an honorary major in and later honorary colonel of the 4th Volunteer Battalion, Northamptonshire Regiment.

Family
Lord Spencer married the Hon. Margaret Baring (14 December 1868 – 4 July 1906), daughter of Edward Baring, 1st Baron Revelstoke, at St James's Church, Piccadilly, on 23 July 1887. They had six children:
Lady Adelaide Margaret Delia Spencer (1889–1981), married Sir Sidney Peel, 1st Baronet, and had issue.
Albert Edward John Spencer, 7th Earl Spencer (1892–1975).
Lieutenant commander Hon. Cecil Edward Robert Spencer RN DSC Croix de Guerre (1894–1928), died unmarried in a riding accident.
Lady Lavinia Emily Spencer (1899–1955), married the 4th Baron Annaly and had issue. Lady Annaly was an extra Lady-in-Waiting to Queen Elizabeth The Queen Mother when she was Duchess of York.
Captain Hon. George Charles Spencer (1903–1982), married (1) Barbara Blumenthal and had issue, married (2) Kathleen Henderson; no issue.
Alexandra Margaret Elizabeth Spencer (1906–1996), married Hon. Henry Douglas-Home (son of the 13th Earl of Home) and had issue. She was the author of "A Spencer Childhood", published in 1994.

Lord Spencer died in September 1922 at his home in St James Place, London, aged 64. He had been ill for four months after contracting a "chill" at a public event in his home county, Northamptonshire. His eldest son Albert succeeded in the earldom. Lord Spencer was buried next to his wife in Saint Mary the Virgin with St John Churchyard, Great Brington, Northamptonshire.

Coat of arms

Ancestry

References

External links

1857 births
1922 deaths
20th-century British landowners
06
Alumni of Trinity College, Cambridge
Knights of the Garter
Knights Grand Cross of the Royal Victorian Order
Grand Crosses of the Order of the Dannebrog
Commanders Grand Cross of the Order of the Polar Star
Grand Cordons of the Order of the Rising Sun
Liberal Party (UK) MPs for English constituencies
Lord-Lieutenants of Northamptonshire
Members of the Privy Council of the United Kingdom
UK MPs 1880–1885
UK MPs 1885–1886
UK MPs 1886–1892
UK MPs 1892–1895
UK MPs 1900–1906
Spencer, E6
UK MPs who were granted peerages
Liberal Party (UK) hereditary peers
Peers created by Edward VII
People educated at Harrow School